Mersin İdmanyurdu (also Mersin İdman Yurdu, Mersin İY, or MİY) Sports Club; located in Mersin, east Mediterranean coast of Turkey in 2012–13. 2012–13 season was the 13th season of Mersin İdmanyurdu football team in Süper Lig, the top level division in Turkey. Mersin İdmanyurdu football team has finished 2012–13 season in 18th place in Turkish Süper Lig and relegated to 2013–14 TFF First League at the end of the season. Team participated in 2012–13 Turkish Cup and was eliminated at group stage.

Ali Kahramanlı was club president. Nurullah Sağlam continued as head coach. However, things have gone bad and he resigned before the end of the first half. Giray Bulak took over the team, but he couldn't succeed yet. Hakan Kutlu was charged to complete the season and prepare team for the next season in the lower league. Attacking midfielder Nduka Ozokwo was the most appeared player with 37 appearances in total. Emmanuel Culio, a winger loaned from Galatasaray made the most appearances in league matches (31 apps.). Márcio Nobre who known as Mert Nobre in Turkey was the top goalscorer with 13 goals.

2012–13 Süper Lig participation
Mersin İdmanyurdu participated in 2011–12 Süper Lig. The league was played as Spor-Toto Süper Lig in that season due to sponsorship reasons. 18 teams attended. The champions and runners-up were qualified for 2013–14 UEFA Champions League (ECL). The third and fourth teams were qualified for 2013–14 UEFA Europa League (UEL). The third team to be qualified for UEL was the Cup runners-up, because Cup winners were already qualified for ECL. Bottom three teams were relegated to 2013–14 TFF First League.

Mersin İdmanyurdu finished 2012–13 Süper Lig season at 18th place and was relegated to 2013–14 TFF First League at the end of the season.

Results summary
Mersin İdmanyurdu (MİY) 2011–12 Süper Lig season league summary.

Sources: 2012–13 Süper Lig pages.

League table
Mersin İdmanyurdu (MİY) 2012–13 Süper Lig season place in league table.

Results by round
Results of games MİY played in 2012–13 Süper Lig by rounds:

First half
Mersin İdmanyurdu (MİY) 2012–13 Süper Lig season first half game reports is shown in the following table.
Kick off times are in EET and EEST.

Sources: 2012–13 Süper Lig pages.

Second half
Mersin İdmanyurdu (MİY) 2012–13 Süper Lig season second half game reports is shown in the following table.
Kick off times are in EET and EEST.

Sources: 2012–13 Süper Lig pages.

2012–13 Turkish Cup participation
2012–13 Turkish Cup was played for 51st time as Ziraat Türkiye Kupası for sponsorship reasons. The Cup was played by 156 teams in three stages. In the first stage, 5 one-leg elimination rounds were played. In the second stage 8 remaining teams played in two groups (A and B) in a two-leg round robin system. In the third stage first and second teams in each group played semifinals and after finals Fenerbahçe won the Cup for the 6th time. Mersin İdmanyurdu took place in the Cup starting from second elimination stage and was eliminated in group stage.

Cup track
The drawings and results Mersin İdmanyurdu (MİY) followed in 2012–13 Turkish Cup are shown in the following table.

Note: In the above table 'Score' shows For and Against goals whether the match played at home or not.

Game details
Mersin İdmanyurdu (MİY) 2012–13 Turkish Cup game reports is shown in the following table.
Kick off times are in EET and EEST.

Source: 2012–13 Turkish Cup (Ziraat Türkiye Kupası) pages.

Management
 Club address was: Palmiye Mah. Adnan Menderes Bl. 1204 Sk. Onur Ap. K.2 D.3 Yenişehir/Mersin.

Club management
 President Ali Kahramanlı continued in his position which he held in 2008.

Coaching team
 Since 22 October 2010 until 18 December 2012. Head coach: Nurullah Sağlam. In his technical team were Lütfü Hindal Gündüz (trainer), Kadir Ekinci (masseur).
 Since 20 December 2012 until 8 March 2013. Head coach: Giray Bulak.
 Since 8 March 2013 until 6 March 2014. Head coach: Hakan Kutlu. His assistant was Kadir Tolga Demirtaş (trainer).

2012–13 Mersin İdmanyurdu head coaches

Note: Only official games were included.

2012–13 squad
Appearances, goals and cards count for 2012–13 Süper Lig and 2012–13 Turkish Cup games. Only the players who appeared in game rosters were included. Kit numbers were allowed to select by players. 18 players appeared in each game roster, three to be replaced. Players are listed in order of appearance.

Sources: TFF club page and maçkolik team page.

U-21 team
Mersin İdmanyurdu U-21 team had participated in 2012–13 U-21 League. League was played in three stages. In the first stage, 46 teams played ranking group games in 4 groups on regional basis. 2 consisted of 11 and 2 consisted of 12 teams. In the second stage winners and runners-up of each ranking group constituted final group while the rest played classification group games. In the third stage, winners of classification groups played quarterfinals with first four placed teams in final group. Mersin idmanyurdu U-21 team took place in Ranking Group 4 and finished 6th in the first stage. In the second stage the team took place in Classification Group 4 and finished 4th with 17 wins, 8 deuces and 15 losses.

See also
 Football in Turkey
 2012–13 Süper Lig
 2012–13 Turkish Cup

Notes and references

2012-13
Turkish football clubs 2012–13 season